4FINGERS (also known as 4FINGERS Crispy Chicken) is a Singaporean multinational chain of fast casual restaurants that specialises in crispy Asian style fried chicken.

Headquartered in Singapore, the chain was founded in 2009 and currently has 27 stores across Singapore, Malaysia, Indonesia, Thailand and Australia. The company expanded regionally to Malaysia in 2015 with twelve stores opening by the end of 2018. The brand also has two outlets in Medan, Indonesia, and one in Central Ladprao, Bangkok, Thailand. From June–July 2017, 4FINGERS also opened an outlet in Melbourne, Australia[2] and two outlets in Queensland, Australia, with plans for expansion to Europe and the US in the future.

History

4FINGERS was Established in 2009. From 2014, The brand expanded from one outlet in Singapore to 21 outlets in Asia-Pacific within 4 years. 4FINGERS is located in malls such as ION Orchard, Plaza Singapura, Orchard Gateway and Changi Airport. In 2015, they opened their first overseas store in Kuala Lumpur, Malaysia located in Mid Valley Megamall and NU Sentral in December 2016. In June 2017, 4FINGERS announced its expansion to Australia, with their first store located on Bourke Street. A branch in Los Angeles closed by November 2020.

Products and stores
The fast casual dining restaurant chain offers free-range fried chicken, baked burger buns and kimslaw (kimchi coleslaw) that's fermented onsite. The menu also features other Asian-inspired menu items including Asian rice boxes, salads and crispy seafood dishes. Restaurant outlets in Singapore, Malaysia and Indonesia have also been Halal certified. Their core products is based on their signature sauces – made from a base of naturally fermented soy sauces with no added preservations or flavorings. The sauces are hand-brushed onto each and every piece of chicken that is served to customers, and this artisan preparation method is followed through at all stores in all countries.

The interior design of the chain outlets features graffiti-marked walls and directional signs influenced by New York City's grunge street style and subway signs. Singapore's urban rebel visual artist Samantha Lo was specially commissioned to paint the exterior walls of its store in Bourke Street, Melbourne with graffiti inspired by Singapore's traditional tile patterns and modern icons.

International presence of 4FINGERS  chains

Asia 

 Singapore
 Malaysia
 Indonesia
 Thailand

Oceania 

 Australia

Acquisition 
4FINGERS announced its acquisition of 50% stake in Australia-based Mad Mex Fresh Mexican Grill (Mad Mex) on 19 September 2019. Mad Mex is an Australian Mexican QSR brand with a strong presence in New Zealand as well.

As part of the partnership, 4FINGERS will initially establish Mad Mex's presence in Southeast Asia and expects to open a number of outlets in Singapore and Malaysia by the end of 2019.

References

External links
 4Fingers acquires 50% stake in Aussie brand Mad Mex

2009 establishments in Singapore
Restaurants established in 2009
Fast-food chains of Singapore
Fast-food poultry restaurants